Danish Demining Group (DDG) is the Human Security Unit under the Danish Refugee Council (DRC), specialised in clearing landmines and unexploded ordnance and reducing armed violence.

DDG’s mission is to recreate a safe environment where people can live without the threat of landmines, unexploded ordnance and small arms and light weapons.
DDG operates with three strategic objectives that define the fundamental and specific aims of operations:

 Enhance human security by clearing landmines and unexploded ordnance, reduce the threat from small arms & light weapons and by providing risk education and raising awareness
 Provide impact oriented, cost effective and innovative solutions in close cooperation with relevant stakeholders such as local communities, government institutions and international collaborative partners
 Support local structures and institutions in finding sustainable solutions to residual problems in a manner that enables economic and social development.

DDG works to enable post-conflict communities to (re-)gain access to their assets and support the efforts of governments and relief- and development organisations to enable recovery and community transition towards social and economic development.

DDG currently operates Mine Action programmes in Afghanistan, Iraq, Libya, Myanmar, Somalia (including Somaliland and Puntland), South Sudan, Sri Lanka and Vietnam, and Armed Violence Reduction programmes in Côte d'Ivoire, Kenya, Libya, Somalia (including Somaliland and Puntland), South Sudan, Uganda and Yemen. In Liberia DDG has been involved in the development of legislation on small arms and light weapons in cooperation with local authorities.

DDG is a founding member of the Global Alliance on Armed Violence (GAAV).

DDG and mine action 

DDG's Mine Action operations are based on the Ottawa Convention’s Five Pillars of Mine Action, namely:
 Clearance of mines and unexploded ordnance (UXO)
 Mine Risk Education
 Victim assistance
 Advocacy
 Stockpile destruction

All work is executed to highest technical standards, security considerations and in due respect for community prioritisation. DDG operations are accredited according to International Mine Action Standards (IMAS) and, where available, to National Technical Standards (NTSG).
DDG employs a wide range of approaches to release safe land, including manual and mechanical demining. An example of DDG approaches is the Village-by-Village Clearance that integrates community liaison, education and clearance and is successfully implemented in several countries where the organisation works.

As part of DDG’s mission to ensure that mine action efficiency results in impact effectiveness DDG has developed an impact monitoring manual  for mine action which is available for all interested.

DDG and armed violence reduction (AVR) 

DDG’s AVR operations are based on the Armed Violence Lens developed by OECD. The lens captures the main elements of armed violence at different levels of intervention:

 The people that are affected by armed violence – both the direct victims and the broader society that also suffers the consequences
 The perpetrators of armed violence (and their motives for armed violence)
 The instruments of armed violence (with a focus on their availability and/or supply)
 The wider institutional/cultural environment (both formal and informal) that enables, or protects against, armed violence

DDG addresses these elements on a local level through a community safety approach and on a national level through support to, and capacity building of, relevant institutions.

In line with the Geneva Declaration on Armed Violence and Development, DDG and DRC have a joint strategy for stabilisation of fragile areas through community-driven safety planning and socio-economic recovery.

See also
 Danish Refugee Council

References

External links 
 Danish Demining Group website 
 Danish Refugee Council website
 Global Alliance on Armed Violence

Mine warfare and mine clearance organizations
Non-profit organizations based in Denmark
Security organizations